Rhabdastrella is a genus of marine sponges belonging to the family of Ancorinidae.

Species 

Rhabdastrella actinosa (Lévi, 1964)
Rhabdastrella aurora (Hentschel, 1909)
Rhabdastrella cordata Wiedenmayer, 1989
Rhabdastrella cribriporosa (Dendy, 1916)
Rhabdastrella distincta (Thiele, 1900)
Rhabdastrella fibrosa Hechtel, 1983
Rhabdastrella globostellata (Carter, 1883)
Rhabdastrella intermedia Wiedenmayer, 1989
Rhabdastrella membranacea (Hentschel, 1909)
Rhabdastrella oxytoxa (Thomas, 1973)
Rhabdastrella primitiva (Burton, 1926)
Rhabdastrella providentiae (Dendy, 1916)
Rhabdastrella reticulata (Carter, 1883)
Rhabdastrella rowi (Dendy, 1916)
Rhabdastrella spinosa (Lévi, 1967)
Rhabdastrella sterrastraea (Row, 1911)
Rhabdastrella trichophora (Lévi e Lévi, 1989)
Rhabdastrella virgula Boury-Esnault, 1973
Rhabdastrella wondoensis (Sim & Kim, 1995)

References 

Tetractinellida